Gardner Island is a largely ice-free island which lies about 3 km west of Broad Peninsula in the southern Vestfold Hills, in Prydz Bay on the Ingrid Christensen Coast of Princess Elizabeth Land, Antarctica. It has been designated an Important Bird Area (IBA) by BirdLife International because it supports about 27,000 breeding pairs of Adélie penguins. Snow petrels also breed on the island. The nearest permanent research station is Australia's Davis Station, 3 km to the east on Broad Peninsula.

See also
Gardner Pinnacles (Pacific island)

References

 

Important Bird Areas of Antarctica
Penguin colonies
Islands of Princess Elizabeth Land